The Peninsular Malaysia tornado outbreak of 2014 is a natural phenomenon that took place in the state of Kedah and Selangor, Malaysia from 14 October to 12 November 2014.

Meteorological synopsis
Malaysian Meteorological Department (MetMalaysia) recognises the phenomenon of the formation of a tornado that too often occurs in Kedah since lately as a 'mystery' that need to be unlocked, especially in finding the cause of formation of the state.

However, the Senior Meteorological Officer of the National Weather Center MetMalaysia, Dr Mohd Hisham Mohd Anip, do not rule out the possibility of the formation of a tornado frequency in this country on a regular basis, the three cases in nearly a month, has to do with changes in monsoon.

Therefore, he said, it will conduct a study on the phenomenon to find the main reason why Malaysia is now seen as synonymous with the formation of a tornado that normally forms around the continental United States.

"Tornado ever recorded hit several states around the peninsula in 2010 and located in Penang, Perlis and Selangor, but the incident did not occur as frequently as in Kedah since lately.

"Whatever we will study the reasons for this phenomenon can be formed in Kedah including assessing why it happened and what the sources and criteria that cause a tornado to form the most important ... we want to know why Kedah to its destination," he told BH.

On 14 October, at least 10 involving residential premises and a school around Kampung Alor Besar in Limavady, was hit by a tornado severely damaged confirmed of type 'landspout', before another similar incident hit five areas especially in Kampung Ulu Ulu, Kampung Sungai Kampung Baru dan Batin, here, causes 72 homes and damaged rural clinics, last Friday.

Recently, strong winds as if a tornado confirmed type 'downdraft' also hit the area Taman Wira Imam, here, yesterday afternoon causing around 13 houses were damaged.

Asked about the inter-monsoon which most closely associated as a cause of the formation of a tornado in Kedah, Mohd Hisham said, it causes the wind coming from different directions, but the atmosphere is also active during this leads to easy formation of storm clouds.

"The situation is thus facilitating the formation of a tornado, but in terms of its scientific we got quite sure why the phenomenon occurs frequently and it is concentrated in Kedah alone.

"The fact that the weather forecast system either in this country or in foreign countries, do not have the ability to detect the formation of a tornado's ... meaning we do not know where a tornado will start or formed.

"In fact, its size is too small tornado that is less than one kilometer (km) also complicate efforts to trace formation. Let's take the example of a tornado that swept ashore several areas in Kedah, it is only about the size of 20 to 30 meters with 30 movements kilometers per hour (km / h), "he said.

Events

On 14 October, an EF1 tornado hit a village in Pendang, Kedah damaging around 10 houses including a school.

On 21 October an EF1 tornado hit a small town of Pandamaran, Klang, Selangor damaging over 30 houses and no fatalities reported.

On 31 October, an EF1-EF2 tornado lashed through Kampung Sungai Bharu and a suburb of Mergong, Alor Setar, Kedah damaging around 57 houses.

On 2 November, an EF1 tornado hit the residential of Taman Wira Mergong, Alor Setar, Kedah damaging 13 houses

On 12 November, an EF1-EF3 tornado lashed through, Kota Sarang Semut in Kedah at approximately 3:00 pm on afternoon. It damaging around 25 houses including a shop

References

Tornadoes in Malaysia
2014 in Malaysia
October 2014 events in Asia
November 2014 events in Asia
Tornadoes of 2014